Michael Alan Schultz (born November 28, 1979) is an American former professional baseball pitcher.

Amateur career
A native of Van Nuys, California, Schultz attended Cleveland High School and Loyola Marymount University. In 1999, he played collegiate summer baseball with the Cotuit Kettleers of the Cape Cod Baseball League and was named a league all-star. He was selected by the Diamondbacks in the second round of the 2000 MLB Draft.

Professional career
On July 16, for the Single-A Lancaster JetHawks, he struck out five batters in an inning. (see .) He made his Major League debut on April 20, for the Diamondbacks. In the 2007– off-season, Schultz signed with the Hiroshima Toyo Carp of the Japanese Central League. On March 2, 2012, Schultz signed a minor league contract with the Washington Nationals. He was released in July of that year.

References

External links

1979 births
Living people
Major League Baseball pitchers
Baseball players from California
Arizona Diamondbacks players
American expatriate baseball players in Japan
Bravos de Margarita players
American expatriate baseball players in Venezuela
Hiroshima Toyo Carp players
Orix Buffaloes players
Arizona League Diamondbacks players
High Desert Mavericks players
Loyola Marymount Lions baseball players
Cotuit Kettleers players
Yakima Bears players
Lancaster JetHawks players
El Paso Diablos players
Tennessee Smokies players
Tucson Sidewinders players
Gulf Coast Nationals players
People from Van Nuys, Los Angeles